Manuel Gulde (born 12 February 1991) is a German professional footballer who plays as a defender for Bundesliga club SC Freiburg.

Club career
For the 2012–13 campaign Gulde joined SC Paderborn 07 on a one-year contract with an option for another year.

In May 2016, Guide signed with SC Freiburg for the forthcoming 2016–17 season.

International career
Gulde is a youth international for Germany.

Career statistics

References

1991 births
Living people
Footballers from Mannheim
German footballers
Association football defenders
Germany youth international footballers
Bundesliga players
2. Bundesliga players
Regionalliga players
TSG 1899 Hoffenheim II players
TSG 1899 Hoffenheim players
SC Paderborn 07 players
Karlsruher SC players
SC Freiburg players